Noqondar (also known as Naqardar) is a village in Jagharq Rural District, Torqabeh District, Torqabeh and Shandiz County, Razavi Khorasan Province, Iran. At the 2006 census, its population was 813, in 216 families.

References 

Populated places in Torqabeh and Shandiz County